Ravi a/l Munusamy is a Malaysian politician and currently serves as Deputy Speaker of the Negeri Sembilan State Legislative Assembly.

Election results

Honours 
  :
  Knight of the Order of Loyal Service to Negeri Sembilan (DBNS) - Dato' (2020)

References 

Living people
People from Negeri Sembilan
Malaysian people of Indian descent
 People's Justice Party (Malaysia) politicians
21st-century Malaysian politicians
Year of birth missing (living people)
Members of the Negeri Sembilan State Legislative Assembly